The Sea Rider is a 1920 American silent drama film directed by Edwin L. Hollywood and starring Harry T. Morey, Webster Campbell, and Alice Calhoun.

Cast
 Harry T. Morey as Stephen Hardy 
 Webster Campbell as Tom Hardy
 Van Dyke Brooke as Captain Halcomb
 Alice Calhoun as Bess Halcomb
 Louiszita Valentine as The Girl
 Frank Norcross as Squire Toler

References

Bibliography
 Connelly, Robert B. The Silents: Silent Feature Films, 1910-36, Volume 40, Issue 2. December Press, 1998.
 McCaffrey, Donald W. & Jacobs, Christopher P. Guide to the Silent Years of American Cinema. Greenwood Publishing, 1999. 
 Munden, Kenneth White. The American Film Institute Catalog of Motion Pictures Produced in the United States, Part 1. University of California Press, 1997.

External links
 

1920 films
1920 drama films
1920s English-language films
American silent feature films
Silent American drama films
American black-and-white films
Films directed by Edwin L. Hollywood
Vitagraph Studios films
1920s American films
English-language drama films